The 2011–12 Ligat Nashim was the 14th season of women's league football under the Israeli Football Association.

The league was won by ASA Tel Aviv University, its third consecutive title and fourth overall. By winning, ASA Tel Aviv qualified to 2012–13 UEFA Women's Champions League.

Maccabi Tzur Shalom Bialik finished bottom of the first division and was relegated to the second division, and was replaced by second division winner, F.C. Ramat HaSharon

Ligat Nashim Rishona

Regular season

Championship group

Relegation group

Top scorers

Ligat Nashim Shniya

League table

Top scorers

References
Ligat Nashim Rishona @IFA
Ligat Nashim Shniya @IFA

Ligat Nashim seasons
1
women
Israel